Ila Ray Hadley (September 18, 1942 – February 15, 1961), was an American figure skater who competed in pairs and ice dance with her brother Ray Hadley, Jr.

Hadley was born in Renton, Washington.  She and her brother won the bronze medal in pairs at the 1960 United States Figure Skating Championships and competed in the Winter Olympics and World Figure Skating Championships that year.  The next year, they finished second in pairs at the U.S. Championships and fourth at the North American Figure Skating Championships.  They died along with their mother on February 15, 1961, when Sabena Flight 548 crashed in Belgium en route to the World Championships in Prague.  She was 18 years old. Her parents met in Eugene, Oregon, and Hadley and her brother are buried in that city.

Results

Pairs

Ice Dance

References

External links
 U.S. Figure Skating biography
 Sports-Reference.com

American female ice dancers
American female pair skaters
Olympic figure skaters of the United States
Figure skaters at the 1960 Winter Olympics
1942 births
1961 deaths
Victims of aviation accidents or incidents in Belgium
Sportspeople from Renton, Washington
Burials in Oregon
Victims of aviation accidents or incidents in 1961
20th-century American women
20th-century American people